Leslie Paul Kozak (born October 28, 1940) is a Canadian former ice hockey player who played 12 games in the National Hockey League (NHL) for the Toronto Maple Leafs during the 1961–62 season, also spending the season with the Rochester Americans of the minor American Hockey League. Prior to turning professional Kozak spent three seasons with the Toronto St. Michael's Majors of the Ontario Hockey Association.

Career statistics

Regular season and playoffs

External links

1940 births
Living people
Canadian ice hockey left wingers
Ice hockey people from Manitoba
Melville Millionaires players
Rochester Americans players
Sportspeople from Dauphin, Manitoba
Toronto Maple Leafs players
Toronto Marlboros players
Toronto St. Michael's Majors players